Pfizer may refer to:

 Pfizer (est. 1849), a multinational pharmaceutical company founded in the U.S. by German immigrants in the 19th century
 Pfizer Animal Health (est. 1956), a former division focused on veterinary pharmacology that was spun-off in 2012, now called as Zoetis
 Pfizer UK (est. 1952), the British subsidiary of the multinational
 Pfizer–BioNTech COVID-19 vaccine
 Pfizer Award, an annual award for the best book on the history of science, awarded by the History of Science Society
 Pfizer Award in Enzyme Chemistry, an award for chemists in enzyme chemistry who are under 40 years old, administered by the Division of Biological Chemistry of the American Chemical Society
 Royal Society Pfizer Award, awarded by the British Royal Society for Africa-based scientists in biological sciences
 Pfizer Human Rights Award, see FICCO
 Charles Pfizer (1824–1906), co-founder of the pharma company Pfizer
 Gustav Pfizer (1807–1890), German poet

See also

 Mason-Pfizer monkey virus
 Pfizer's rule of five, a rule of thumb for determining if a pharmacologically active chemical compound is likely to become an orally active drug in humans
 Pfizer-e (erythromycin)
 
 Pfitzer (surname)
 Pfitzner (disambiguation)
 Pfitz (disambiguation)
 Fizer